Trinity Theological College is a Baptist college in Thahekhu, Dimapur, affiliated with the Nagaland Baptist Church Council.

History 
Trinity Theological College was founded on 14 November 1992. The college was temporarily shifted from the original intended place to WSBAK mission centre where the first college session commenced on 10 July 1993. Later, in 1997 the college shifted to its present permanent location on the land donated by Thahekhu Village, Dimapur.

Affiliations and Association 
The College is registered with the Government of Nagaland as an educational institution since 1993 with an approved constitution. The same year the college was approved by Higher and Technical Education Nagaland, Kohima. 

TTC is also a recognized institution of the Nagaland Baptist Church Council (NBCC) and Council of Baptist Churches of North East India (CBCNEI). The college is granted affiliation by the Senate of Serampore University to offer B.Th degree (1996) and B.D. Degree (2006). However under the new regulation of the Senate of Serampore College University, the college has now phased out the B. Th. program and offers only the B.D program. Trinity Theological College is sponsored by Sumi Baptist Convention (SBC).

Location 
Trinity Theological College is located at Thahekhu village, Dimapur. It is 5 kilometers drive from the City of Dimapur.

Courses Offered 
 Bachelor of Divinity
 Master of Theology

References

Colleges in India
Christian seminaries and theological colleges in India
Universities and colleges in Nagaland
Dimapur district